Kevin Edwing Malpon (born 1 March 1996) is a Guadeloupean professional footballer who plays as a midfielder.

Career
Malpon made his league debut for Mladá Boleslav on 26 July 2015 in a 2–4 Czech First League away loss at Slovan Liberec.

References

External links
 
 Kevin Malpon profile at FK Mladá Boleslav webpage
 

Guadeloupean footballers
1996 births
Living people
Association football midfielders
Czech First League players
Championnat National 3 players
K.S.V. Roeselare players
FK Mladá Boleslav players
FC Versailles 78 players